Joseph Kendall may refer to:

 Joseph G. Kendall (1788–1847), U.S. Representative from Massachusetts
 Joseph M. Kendall (1863–1933), U.S. Representative from Kentucky
 Joseph Kendall (cricketer), English cricketer

See also
Joe Kendall (disambiguation)